Martha Anthouli (born August 13, 2004, in Thessaloniki, Greece) is a Greek female professional volleyball player, who has been a member of the Greece women's national volleyball team. She currently plays for Panathinaikos.

References

External links
 
 profile at greekvolley.gr 
 Martha Evdokia Anthouli at Volleybox.com 

2004 births
Living people
Greek women's volleyball players
Panathinaikos Women's Volleyball players
Volleyball players from Thessaloniki
Opposite hitters
21st-century Greek women